Tiger tail ice cream, also  called tiger tiger or tiger flavor, is a Canadian orange-flavoured ice cream with black liquorice swirl. It is named for its resemblance to orange and black tiger stripes. Tiger tail is most popular in  parts of Canada and not often found elsewhere. Created by Morgan Carr, it is a distinctly flavoured ice cream. This flavour of ice cream is offered by such companies as Chapman's and Kawartha. Tiger tail is considered a retro ice cream flavour and it has seen a nostalgia-related resurgence in recent years.

References

Flavors of ice cream
Canadian desserts
Liquorice (confectionery)
Orange production
Tigers in popular culture
Citrus dishes